Oscar Londono (born 7 February 1971) is a Colombian-born former football midfielder. He later worked as a manager for football clubs in France and Switzerland.

References

1971 births
Living people
Colombian emigrants to France
French footballers
FC Lausanne-Sport players
FC Grenchen players
SC Kriens players
Servette FC players
Association football midfielders
Swiss Super League players
Swiss football managers
FC Stade Nyonnais managers
FC Sion non-playing staff